Kenmare Municipal Airport  is a mile southeast of Kenmare, in Ward County, North Dakota. The National Plan of Integrated Airport Systems for 2011–2015 categorized it as a general aviation facility.

Facilities
The airport covers 158 acres (64 ha) at an elevation of 1,962 feet (598 m). Its single runway, 8/26, is 3,700 by 60 feet (1,128 x 18 m).

In the year ending August 14, 2012 the airport had 3,175 aircraft operations, average 264 per month: 91% general aviation and 9% air taxi. 21 aircraft were then based at this airport: 95% single-engine and 5% helicopter.

See also 
 List of airports in North Dakota

References

External links 
 Airport page at City of Kenmare website
 Kenmare (7K5) at  North Dakota Aeronautics Commission airport directory
 Aerial image as of September 1995 from USGS The National Map
 
 

Airports in North Dakota
Buildings and structures in Ward County, North Dakota
Transportation in Ward County, North Dakota